Suematsu (written: 末松) is a Japanese surname. Notable people with the surname include:

, Japanese politician
, Japanese politician and writer
, Japanese scientist
, Japanese politician

Japanese-language surnames